The term check card can refer to:

 An identification card issued by a retailer allowing the holder to tender payment by check. Such cards were commonly issued in the United States by supermarkets and other retailers before the widespread use of debit cards.
 In Ireland and the United Kingdom, similar cards known as cheque guarantee cards were issued by banks to their customers.
 In the United States, the term ‘check card’ was first coined by H. Robert Heller, then the President of Visa Inc. to indicate to users that it could be used just like a check.
 A debit card.

Payment systems